The Anthem of Arkhangelsk Oblast is an anthem used for the Arkhangelsk Oblast, Russia. The anthem was approved by the Arkhangelsk Regional Assembly on 31 October 2007, and the author of the lyrics and composer of the anthem's music is Nina Konstantinovna Meshko.

Lyrics

References

Russian anthems
European anthems
Culture of Arkhangelsk Oblast
National anthem compositions in F major